Graeme Coull (15 March 1928 – 1 October 2004) was a New Zealand cricketer. He played in eight first-class matches for Canterbury from 1954 to 1962.

See also
 List of Canterbury representative cricketers

References

External links
 

1928 births
2004 deaths
New Zealand cricketers
Canterbury cricketers
Cricketers from Christchurch